Percy Barnfather  (17 December 1879 – 18 December 1951) was an English professional footballer, who made 265 appearances and scored 85 goals in all competitions as an outside right for Croydon Common, before and during the First World War.

Playing career
An outside right, Barnfather joined Second Division club Barnsley in 1903 and made 25 appearances during the 1903–04 season, scoring four goals. In June 1904, he joined Southern League First Division club New Brompton and remained at Priestfield for two seasons. After a non-playing spell with Southampton, he spent the 1906–07 season back in his native northeast with North Eastern League club West Stanley. Barnfather returned to the Southern League to join Second Division club Croydon Common in August 1907 and aside from a spell with Norwich City and a second spell with West Stanley, he would spend the majority of the remainder of his career with the Robins. Barnfather's professional career with Croydon Common came to an end at the end of the 1914–15 season, by which time he had made 140 appearances and scored 48 goals during three spells at The Nest. He finished his career with a short spell at Southern League First Division club Merthyr Town during the 1919–20 season, under manager and former Croydon Common teammate Harry Hadley.

Personal life 
Barnfather was born in Byker and attended Welleck Road School in Newcastle. He was a plumber and engineer by trade and was married with three children. After retiring from football, Barnfather worked in a clerical role in the Ministry of Supply. He died of stomach cancer in 1951 and is buried in Croydon.

First World War 
In December 1914, four months after the outbreak of the First World War, Barnfather enlisted as a private in the Football Battalion of the Middlesex Regiment. Through the course of his service, he rose from private to captain and won the Military Cross in 1918.

Career statistics

Honours 
Croydon Common
Southern League Second Division (2): 1908–09, 1913–14
 Southern Football Alliance (1): 1912–13

References

1879 births
1951 deaths
English Football League players
Gillingham F.C. players
Barnsley F.C. players
Norwich City F.C. players
Croydon Common F.C. players
Middlesex Regiment officers
British Army personnel of World War I
West Stanley F.C. players
Merthyr Town F.C. players
Southern Football League players
Footballers from Newcastle upon Tyne
Association football outside forwards
Recipients of the Military Cross
Deaths from stomach cancer
English footballers
Deaths from cancer in England
Military personnel from Newcastle upon Tyne